

Chimera is the eleventh studio album by Canadian industrial/electronic music group Delerium in 2003 (see 2003 in music).

The song "Above the Clouds" was released as an iTunes online exclusive.

Track listing

Disc one
"Love" (Zoë Johnston, Bill Leeb, Carmen Rizzo, Jamie Muhoberac) – 4:03
Vocals: Zoë Johnston
Samples: "Vision (O Euchari In Leta Via)", from The Music of Hildegard von Bingen
"After All" (Jaël, Leeb, Rhys Fulber) – 4:51
Vocals: Jaël
"Just a Dream" (Margaret Far, Leeb, Fulber) – 5:27
Vocals: Margaret Far
"Run for It" (Leigh Nash, Leeb, Fulber) – 4:35
Vocals: Leigh Nash
"Truly" (Nerina Pallot, Leeb, Rizzo, Muhoberac) – 4:38
Vocals: Nerina Pallot
"Serenity" (Leeb, Fulber, Chris Elliot) – 7:20
Samples: "Alleluia Veni Domine", traditional
"Touched" (Rachel Fuller) – 4:05
Vocals: Rachel Fuller
"Forever After" (Songul Akturk, Muhoberac, Leeb, Rizzo) – 4:35
Vocals: Sultana (Songul Akturk)
"Fallen" (Rani Kamal, Muhoberac, Leeb) – 3:50
Vocals: Rani
"Orbit of Me" (Nash, Leeb, Muhoberac, Rizzo, Kent Stephany) – 5:23
Vocals: Leigh Nash
"Magic" (Julee Cruise, Leeb, Rizzo, Muhoberac, Stephany) – 4:36
Vocals: Julee Cruise
"Eternal Odyssey" (Leeb, Fulber) – 9:46
Samples: Adagio for Strings (Agnus Dei choral arrangement), composed by Samuel Barber
"Returning" (Kristy Thirsk, Leeb, Fulber) – 5:14
Vocals: Kristy Thirsk
Many online sources, particularly databases such as Allmusic [], list "Serenity Touched" as one song, as well as "Eternal Odyssey Returning". This is due to the formatting of the track list on the CD case back insert, which causes visual ambiguity (the band's MP3.com page also had tracks listed under the incorrect names).

Disc two
The contents of disc 2 vary with region: this information is for the most common North American release.
"Stopwatch Hearts" (Leeb, Emily Haines, Muhoberac, Rizzo) – 4:09
Vocals: Emily Haines
"After All" (Andrew Sega Remix) – 7:25
Music videos: "Silence", "Flowers Become Screens", "Aria"

The "Andrew Sega Remix" of "After All" was the winner of an amateur remix contest held by Nettwerk prior to the album's release.

Charts

Weekly charts

Year-end charts

References

Delerium albums
2003 albums
Nettwerk Records albums
Albums produced by Rhys Fulber
Albums produced by Ryan Greene